Ivana Tikvić (born 20 March 1994) is a Croatian female professional basketball player. She currently plays for Olympiacos in Greece.

External links
Profile at eurobasket.com

1994 births
Living people
Basketball players from Zagreb
Croatian women's basketball players
Croatian expatriate basketball people in Greece
Croatian expatriate basketball people in Italy
Olympiacos Women's Basketball players
Centers (basketball)